Blue Fire is a launched roller coaster at Europa-Park.  The coaster opened in 2009 as part of a new Iceland-themed expansion to Europa-Park. As the first launched coaster built by Mack Rides, Blue Fire was the park's tenth roller coaster and the first to feature inversions. The ride was sponsored by Gazprom ever since, until the invasion of Ukraine launched by Russia on 24th February 2022. The ride/park now no longer sponsor's Gazprom and had to remodel the interior with a new sponsorship Nord Stream 2 . The ride's tagline is "Discover Pure Energy".

Layout
Blue Fire is a combination of a dark ride and a launched roller coaster. The ride begins with a dark ride portion lasting roughly 45 seconds.

One turn culminates in a mid-course brake run; and, exiting the brake run, the train completes a twisted horseshoe roll that partially passes over a lake. One airtime hill follows, and the ride ends with a heartline roll and final brake run.

Blue Fire's twisted horseshoe roll was the first on any roller coaster in Europe and the first on any Mack roller coaster. The element itself had only previously appeared on one other roller coaster, making its debut on Maverick.

Construction
Blue Fire opened as part of the first phase in a new Iceland-themed area of Europa-Park, which expanded the park's overall area from 70 to 85 hectares.  Europa-Park's directors, Roland and Jürgen Mack, broke ground on the new Iceland area in June 2008.  Europa-Park started posting teasers for Blue Fire on their website in July 2008.  The teasers made reference to the coaster's acceleration, inversions, energy, and Iceland theme.  In August 2008, the park released an animated teaser, again showing the Iceland theme, along with the train traversing part of the ride's layout.

Construction of Blue Fire's track commenced in early September 2008, and the park issued a press release about the new ride on September 18.  The press release confirmed that the park was expanding by 15 hectares and gave further details about Blue Fire's launch system and trains. It also mentioned that Blue Fire had the tallest loop of any roller coaster in Europe at 32 metres, which Screamscape blogger Lance Hart pointed out was incorrect because the first loop on Dragon Khan at PortAventura Park reaches a height of 36 metres.  The park has since clarified that Blue Fire's loop is the tallest on any launched coaster in Europe.

The builders of Blue Fire topped off the ride on October 1, 2008, and completed the track's layout in mid-December 2008.

The construction effort required that Europa-Park cut the Fjord-Rafting river rapids ride in half to allow construction workers to access Blue Fire's site.  The removed part of Fjord-Rafting was restored as a tunnel section and reopened before the 2009 season.

Trains and colour scheme

Blue Fire has five trains with five cars each.  These cars accommodate two rows of two riders, for a total of 20 riders per train. However, the ride can only operate 4 trains on the circuit at any given time, with the 5th acting as a spare. With a two-minute, 20-second ride and separate loading and unloading stations, 1,450 riders can ride Blue Fire per hour.  The trains use lap bar restraints rather than the over-the-shoulder restraints employed on Maverick and other Intamin Accelerator coasters, and stadium-style seating like that of Millennium Force.  As opposed to more conventional lap bars found on most wooden roller coasters, the lap bar on a seat on Blue Fire is above the seat when the train is not occupied.  However, the restraint itself rests in the rider's lap instead of across the rider's chest.

Carrying on the Iceland theme of its section of the park, Blue Fire has blue track and light gray supports. The attraction's theming was designed by P&P Projects.

Sponsorships
From 2010 to 2019, Blue Fire was sponsored by the Russian energy corporation Gazprom. The sponsorship saw the construction of the 1,300 square meter GAZPROM Theme World - The Wonder of Energy exhibition hall. For the 2020 season, the sponsorship was switched to Nord Stream 2, the then-ongoing extension of the existing Nord Stream 1 natural gas pipelines. The sponsorship was suspended when the Russian Federation invaded Ukraine on the morning of February 24, 2022, and the Nord Stream 2 project was cancelled by Chancellor Olaf Scholz. All references to the sponsorship were quickly removed online and the Nord Stream exhibition hall was simply renamed to "Blue Fire Dome".

Height restriction
Europa-Park has set height and age restrictions for Blue Fire. No one under 1.30 metres (51 inches, 4 feet 3 inches) or 7 years of age may ride.

Awards

References

External links

 NoLimits simulation of Blue Fire (Google Video)

Roller coasters introduced in 2009
Roller coasters in Germany
Articles containing video clips
Rides at Europa-Park